The City of Nedlands is a local government area in Perth, Western Australia. It was established in 1893 as the Claremont Road District, with a chairman elected by the road board members as its leader. Claremont split away to become the Municipality of Claremont (now the Town of Claremont) in 1898. The road district was renamed to the Nedlands Road District in 1931. It became a municipality in 1956, now called the Municipality of Nedlands, with a mayor as its leader. Following the passage of the Local Government Act 1960, it became the City of Nedlands.

Claremont Road District

Nedlands Road District

Municipality of Nedlands

City of Nedlands

References 

Lists of local government leaders in Western Australia
City of Nedlands